Buganda is a Bantu kingdom within Uganda. The kingdom of the Baganda people, Buganda is the largest of the traditional kingdoms in present-day East Africa, consisting of Buganda's Central Region, including the Ugandan capital Kampala. The 14 million Baganda (singular Muganda; often referred to simply by the root word and adjective, Ganda) make up the largest Ugandan region, representing approximately 16% of Uganda's population.

Buganda has a long and extensive history. Unified in the 13th century under the first king Kato Kintu, the founder of Buganda's Kintu Dynasty, Buganda grew to become one of the largest and most powerful states in East Africa during the 18th and 19th centuries. Before the 12th century, the present-day Buganda region was a kingdom known as Muwaawa, which means a sparsely populated place. During the Scramble for Africa, and following unsuccessful attempts to retain its independence against British imperialism, Buganda became the center of the Uganda Protectorate in 1884; the name Uganda, the Swahili term for Buganda, was adopted by British officials. Under British rule, many Baganda acquired status as colonial administrators, and Buganda became a major producer of cotton and coffee.

Following Uganda's independence in 1962, the kingdom was abolished by Uganda's first Prime Minister Milton Obote in 1966 declaring Uganda a republic. Following years of disturbance under Obote and dictator Idi Amin, as well as several years of internal divisions among Uganda's ruling National Resistance Movement under Yoweri Museveni, the President of Uganda since 1986, the kingdom was officially restored in 1993. Buganda is now a traditional kingdom and thus occupies a largely ceremonial role.

Since the restoration of the kingdom in 1993, the king of Buganda, known as the Kabaka, has been Muwenda Mutebi II. He is recognized as the 36th Kabaka of Buganda. The current queen, known as the Nnabagereka or Kaddulubale is Queen Sylvia Nagginda.

Location
Buganda's boundaries are marked by the Tanzanian border in Lake Victoria (Lake Nnalubaale) to the south, the River Nile (River Kiira) to the east, Lake Kyoga to the north, Ankole to the west and River Kafu to the northwest.

Language
The Luganda language is widely spoken in Uganda and is the most popular language in Uganda along with English. Luganda is also widely spoken in and around other countries in East Africa, such as Kenya, Tanzania and Rwanda. It is even used in South Sudan,  mostly for business transactions. Luganda is the most spoken local language in Uganda. Despite all efforts made by different governments to weaken the language, it has survived and still growing.

In literature and common discourse, Buganda is often referred to as Central Uganda.

Geography and environment
Ganda villages, sometimes as large as forty to fifty homes, were generally located on hillsides, leaving hilltops and swampy lowlands uninhabited, to be used for crops or pastures. Early Ganda villages surrounded the home of a chief or headman, which provided a common meeting ground for members of the village. The chief collected tribute from his subjects, provided tribute to the Kabaka, who was the ruler of the kingdom, distributed resources among his subjects, maintained order, and reinforced social solidarity through his decision-making skills. During the late 19th century, Ganda villages became more dispersed as the role of the chiefs diminished in response to political turmoil, population migration, and occasional popular revolts.

Districts
Buganda currently is divided into 26 districts as of 2021. These are:

Buikwe
Bukomansimbi
Butambala
Buvuma
Gomba
Kalangala
Kalungu
Kampala
Kassanda
Kayunga
Kiboga
Kyankwanzi
Kyotera
Luwero
Lwengo
Lyantonde 
Masaka
Mityana
Mpigi
Mubende
Mukono
Nakaseke
Nakasongola
Rakai
Ssembabule
Wakiso

Amasaza 
Buganda is made up of 18 political divisions called amasaza in Luganda. These are:
 Buddu
 Bulemeezi
 Buruuli
 Buweekula
 Buvuma
 Bugerere
 Busujju
 Busiro
 Butambala
 Ggomba
 Kyaddondo
 Kabula
 Kyaggwe
 Kooki|Kkooki
 Mawogola
 Mawokota
 Ssingo
 Ssese

Government 

Buganda is a constitutional monarchy. The current Head of State is the Kabaka, Muwenda Mutebi II who has reigned since the restoration of the kingdom in 1993. The Head of Government is the Katikkiro (Prime Minister) Charles Mayiga, who was appointed by the Kabaka in 2013. The Parliament of Buganda is the Lukiiko.

Prior to the Buganda Agreement of 1900, Buganda was an almost absolute monarchy. Under the Kabaka, there were three types of chief:  (administrative) chiefs, who were appointed directly by the Kabaka; traditional  chieftains; and  chiefs, who served as representatives of the Kabaka, charged with "maintaining internal security, supervising royal estates and military duties". The 1900 agreement, however, greatly enhanced the power of the Lukiiko (which had previously been simply an advisory council) at the expense of the Kabaka. While Buganda retained self-government, as one part of the larger Uganda Protectorate, it would henceforth be subject to formal British overrule. The Buganda Agreement of 1955 continued the transition from absolute to constitutional monarchy.

During Uganda independence, the constitutional position of Buganda (and the degree to which it would be able to exercise self-government) was a major issue. Discussions as part of the Uganda Relationships Commission resulted in the Buganda Agreement of 1961 and the first Constitution of Uganda (1962), as part of which Buganda would be able to exercise a high degree of autonomy. This position was reversed during 1966–67, however, before the Kabakaship and Lukiiko were disestablished altogether in 1967 before being restored in 1993.

History

Creation Myth 
The Baganda have a creation myth that says that the first man on earth (and Buganda in particular) was Kintu. Kintu married Nnambi, the daughter of the god, Ggulu. The Baganda are the descendants of Kintu and Nnambi. According to this myth, Walumbe, Nambi's jealous brother is responsible for all human disease and death on earth. Another brother, Kayiikuuzi tried to protect humans from Walumbe but failed. To this day, Kayiikuuzi is still trying to capture Walumbe from the underground where he hides and take him back home.

Precolonial times 
Before the arrival of Europeans in the region, Buganda was an expanding, "embryonic empire". It built fleets of war canoes from the 1840s to take control of Lake Victoria and the surrounding regions and subjugated several weaker peoples. These subject peoples were then exploited for cheap labor. The first Europeans to enter the Kingdom of Buganda were British explorers John Hanning Speke and Captain Sir Richard Francis Burton while searching for the headwaters of the Nile in 1862. They found a highly organized political system which was marred, however, by the ongoing practice of mass human sacrifice estimated at 800 persons annually.

The explorer and journalist Henry Morton Stanley visited Buganda in 1875 and provided an estimate of Buganda troop strength. Stanley counted 3,000 troops and a fleet of war canoes.  At Buganda's capital, Lubaga, Stanley found a well-ordered town surrounding the king's palace, which was situated atop a commanding hill. A tall cane fence surrounded the palace compound, which was filled with grass-roofed houses, meeting halls, and storage buildings. Thronging the grounds were foreign ambassadors. seeking audiences, chiefs going to the royal advisory council, messengers running errands, and a corps of young pages.  He estimated the population of the kingdom at 2,000,000

 

Women and Royal Power

Pre-colonial Buganda was a strongly hierarchical and patriarchal kingdom. However, of the three people who could be called 'Kabaka' or king two were women, the queen mother and the queen sister. The Queen mother had political and ritual functions, possessed her own courts and had the power to collect taxes.  The death of the Kabaka's mother could instigate a time of terror, as the Kabaka would have his executioners catch and kill many people in his grief. The senior wives of the king would also warrant special respect and had status and privilege within Ganda society. She was considered superior to all other chiefs and technically the most powerful commoner, being a royal by marriage.

Colonial times

Buganda was colonized by the British and made a protectorate of the United Kingdom in 1884.  The move towards independence reached a climax when the Kukiko, the parliament of Buganda, declared independence on 8 October 1960 and requested termination of the British protectorate.

While in exile, Mwanga II was received into the Anglican Church, was baptized with the name of Danieri (Daniel). He spent the rest of his life in exile. He died in 1903, aged 35 years. In 2010 his remains were repatriated and buried at Kasubi.

On 24 July 1993, the monarchy of Buganda was restored, when Ronald Muwewenda Mutebi II, was crowned king.  Ronald Muwewenda Mutebi II was the son of King 'Freddy', who had been deposed by the Ugandan government in 1966.

Attempted secession in Kayunga
In September 2009, some members of the minority Banyala ethnic group led by a recently retired UPDF Captain Isabanyala Baker Kimeze who announced that Bugerere had seceded from the Kingdom of Buganda. The Banyala make up 0.09% of the population of Uganda and 13% of the population of the district, Kayunga, that in their opinion they were leading into secession. Because of the resulting tensions, the government of Uganda stopped the Kabaka of Buganda from traveling to Bugerere, leading to riots in the capital Kampala and neighboring districts. Thirty were killed in what came to be known as the Buganda riots.

Previous Kings 
On July 31, 2022, Buganda unveiled portraits of its former Kings (bassekabaka) based on oral narrations and written histories dating back to the founding of the kingdom.

Flags

Demographics
Buganda had a projected population of about 11,952,600 people in 2021.

Clans of Buganda
As of 2009, there were at least 52 recognized clans within the kingdom, with at least another four making a claim to clan status. Within this group of clans, there are four distinct sub-groups, which reflect historical waves of immigration to Buganda.

Nansangwa
The oldest clans trace their lineage to Bakiranze Kivebulaya, who is supposed to have ruled in the region from about 400 AD until about 1300 AD. These seven clans are referred to as the Nansangwa, or the indigenous:

 Lugave (Pangolin)
 Mmamba (Lungfish)
 Ngeye (Colobus monkey)
 Njaza (Reedbuck)
 Ennyange (Cattle egret)
 Fumbe (Civet cat)
 Ngonge (Otter)
 Mpindi (Cowpea)
 Ngabi (Bushbuck)
 Njovu (Elephant)

Kintu migration
The Abalasangeye dynasty came to power through the conquests of Kabaka of Buganda ssekabaka Kintu, which are estimated to have occurred sometime between 1200 and 1400 AD.

Thirteen clans that are believed to have come with Kintu:

 Ekkobe (Liana fruit)
 Mbwa (Dog)
 Mpeewo (Oribi antelope)
 Mpologoma (Lion)
 Namuŋoona (Pied crow)
 Ngo (Leopard)
 Ŋonge (Otter)
 Njovu (Elephant)
 Nkejje (Cichlids)
 Nkima  (Vervet monkey)
 Ntalaganya (Blue duiker)
 Nvubu (Hippopotamus)
 Nvuma (Pearl)

The descendants of the Basimba people (also known as Bashimba) which is a Bisa and Ambo nickname of the Clan of the leopards, the bena Ngo in Zambia, who settled at Mpogo, Sironko District, are among the Ngo Clan group that come along with Kabaka Kato Kintu in his immigration.

Kato Kimera migration
Around 1370 AD another wave of immigration began, assisted by Kabaka Kimera, who was the son of Omulangira Kalemeera. Kabaka Kimera was born in Kibulala, and returned to Buganda with Jjumba of the Nkima clan and other Buganda elders.

These eleven clans are:

 Bugeme
 Butiko (Mushrooms)
 Kasimba (Genet)
 Kayozi (Jerboa)
 Kibe (Fox)
 Mbogo (Buffalo)
 Musu/Omusu (Edible rat)
 Ngabi (Bushbuck)
 Nkerebwe (Jungle Shrew)
 Nsuma (snout fish)
 Nseenene (Copiphorini)

Economy
The traditional Ganda economy relied on crop cultivation. In contrast with many other East African economic systems, cattle played only a minor role. Many Baganda hired laborers from outside Buganda to herd the Baganda's cattle, for those who owned livestock. Bananas were the most important staple food, providing the economic base for the region's dense population growth.
This crop does not require shifting cultivation or bush fallowing to maintain soil fertility, and as a result, Ganda villages were quite permanent. Women did most of the agricultural work, while men often engaged in commerce and politics (and in precolonial times, warfare). Before the introduction of woven cloth, traditional clothing was manufactured from the bark of trees.

Agriculture 
Buganda produces a wide variety of agricultural products for local consumption and export.
Matooke, beef, poultry, maize and sweet potatoes are some of the key products.

Energy 
Buganda's main source of energy is hydroelectricity from the Nnalubaale Power Station in Njeru and the Kiira Hydroelectric Power Station on Lake Nnalubaale (Lake Victoria). Smaller thermal power plants operate in Buganda like the heavy fuel oil-fired Namanve Power Station in Namanve, Mukono District. Small solar power plants like the Kabulasoke Solar Power Station in Kabulasoke, Gomba District operate in Buganda.

Tourism 
Buganda has several tourist attractions and cultural sites including the Kasubi Tombs, and Ssese Islands.

Transport 
Transport in Buganda is mainly by road, followed by water transport and rail transport under the Uganda Railways Corporation.

Air transport
The main airport, Entebbe International Airport, is located at Entebbe.
Smaller airstrips exist like the Kololo Airstrip (Kampala Airport) in Kololo, Mutukula Airport in Mutukula, Nakasongola Airport in Nakasongola, Namulonge Airport in Namulonge, and Kajjansi Airfield in Kajjansi.

Culture

Cinema 

Several actors and actresses have been very influential in Kiganda drama including Sam Bagenda of the Ebonies, Mariam Ndagire, Aloysius Matovu, Abby Mukiibi, Charles Ssenkubuge, Alex Mukulu, Kato Lubwama, Benon Kibuuka, Nana Kagga, Sarah Kisawuzi, Ashraf Ssemwogerere, Aisha Kyomuhangi, Ahmed Lubowa and Hellen Lukoma.

Cuisine 

Kiganda Cuisine is dominated by Matooke. The matooke is sometimes prepared as part of Katogo. Modern Kiganda cuisine has been greatly influenced by Indian, English and Arab cuisine.
The main dishes are almost always served with stew, soup or sauce.

Fashion 
Historically, Barkcloth was the textile of choice mainly worn by the royals from the days of Ssekabaka Kimera and later everyone else starting with the reign of Ssekabaka Semakookiro. Barkcloth is no longer as popular as it once was and has been replaced with cotton and silk. However, some fashion designers like Jose Hendo, still use it today. Barkcloth is also worn as a symbol of protest, mourning, or both. The traditional dress is the Kanzu for men and the Gomesi for women. However, Western-style fashion is very popular these days.

Some of the more common hairstyles are Bantu knots (especially Bitutwa), cornrows, Pencil braids (Biswahili), Braids, Crotchets, Weaves and Afros.

Some accessories may include necklaces, anklets, earrings, bracelets and waist beads ( or obutiti and they are always worn under ones clothes i.e. undergarments).

Literature 
Buganda has several famous writers like Michael Nsimbi, Solomon E. K. Mpalanyi and Apollo Kaggwa.

Music 
Several genres of music are popular in Buganda. Musicians produce traditional Kiganda music, Kadongo Kamu, Zouk, Dancehall and Reggae.

Some of the most famous Kiganda musicians and performers are Annet Nandujja, Elly Wamala, Fred Masagazi, Herman Basudde, Paulo Kafeero, Gerald Kiweewa and Willy Mukabya.

See also
 Luganda language
 Kabaka of Buganda
 Mpindi clan
 Mutesa II of Buganda
 Muwenda Mutebi II of Buganda
 Baganda Music
 The legend of Kintu
 Uganda Cowries
 Kanzu
 Gomesi
 King's African Rifles (KAR)

References

Bibliography

Further reading

External links 
 

 
Sub-regions of Uganda
Ugandan monarchies
Non-sovereign monarchy
14th-century establishments in Africa
1962 disestablishments in Africa